Panelling (or paneling in the U.S.) is a millwork wall covering constructed from rigid or semi-rigid components. These are traditionally interlocking wood, but could be plastic or other materials.

Panelling was developed in antiquity to make rooms in stone buildings more comfortable both by insulating the room from the stone, and reflecting radiant heat from wood fires, making heat more evenly distributed in the room. In more modern buildings, such panelling is often installed for decorative purposes.  Panelling, such as wainscoting and boiserie in particular, may be extremely ornate and is particularly associated with 17th and 18th century interior design, Victorian architecture in Britain, and its international contemporaries.

Wainscot panelling 

The term wainscot (  or  ) originally applied to high quality riven oak boards.

Wainscot oak came from large, slow-grown forest trees, and produced boards that were knot-free, low in tannin, light in weight, and easy to work with. It was preferred to home-grown oak, especially in the Netherlands and United Kingdom, because it was a far superior product and dimensionally stable.

The Oxford English Dictionary states that it derives from the Middle Low German wagenschot as well as wageschot or 'wall-board'. Johnson's Dictionary defined it thus: 

A 'wainscot' was therefore a board of riven (and later quarter-sawn) oak, and wainscoting was the panelling made from it. During the 18th century, oak wainscot was almost entirely superseded for panelling in Europe by softwoods (mainly Scots pine and Norway spruce), but the name stuck:

Today the term wainscot refers commonly to the different treatment of the lower part of the wall (roughly a meter, 3-4 feet); see also dado.

Boiserie 

Boiserie (often used in the plural boiseries) is the French term used to define ornate and intricately carved wood panelling. Boiseries became popular in the latter part of the 17th century in French interior design, becoming a de rigueur  feature of fashionable French interiors throughout the 18th century. Such panels were most often painted in two shades of a chosen color or in contrasting colors, with gilding reserved for the main reception rooms. The Palace of Versailles contains many fine examples of white painted boiseries with gilded mouldings installed in the reigns of Louis XV and Louis XVI. The panels were not confined to just the walls of a room but were used to decorate doors, frames, cupboards, and shelves also. It was standard for mirrors to be installed and framed by the carved boiseries, especially above the mantelpiece of a fireplace. Paintings were also installed within boiseries, above doorways or set into central panels.

See also
 Moulding (decorative)
 Ornament (art)
 Panel edge staining
 Structural insulated panel
 Vacuum insulated panel
 Crown moulding
 Dado (architecture)
 Dado rail
 Woodie (car body style)
 Wall panel

References

External links
 

Woodworking
Wallcoverings

fr:Lambris
sv:Panel